Gerald Taiaiake Alfred is an author, educator and activist, born in Montreal, Quebec, in 1964 and raised in the community of Kahnawake. Alfred is an internationally recognized Kanien’kehá:ka professor.

Early life and education
Alfred grew up in Kahnawake and graduated from Loyola High School in Montreal. After high school, he served in the Marine Corps for three years until 1984. He then received a Bachelor of Arts in History from Concordia University, an Master of Arts and Ph.D. from Cornell University.

Career
Alfred was the founding director of the Indigenous Governance Program (serving from 1999 until 2015) and was awarded a Canada Research Chair 2003–2007, in addition to a National Aboriginal Achievement Award in education. In 2019 he resigned from the University of Victoria in the wake of an investigation of an allegedly toxic learning environment.

Bibliography
 Heeding the Voices of our Ancestors : Kahnawake Mohawk Politics and the Rise of Native Nationalism, Oxford University Press (Canada), 1995.
 Peace, Power, Righteousness : an Indigenous manifesto, Oxford University Press (Canada), 1999.
 Wasáse: Indigenous Pathways of Action and Freedom, Peterborough: Broadview Press, 2005.
 Peace, Power, Righteousness : an Indigenous manifesto, 2nd Ed., Oxford University Press (Canada), 2009.

References

External links

 Personal web site of Taiaiake Alfred

1964 births
Living people
Activists from Montreal
Canadian Mohawk people
Concordia University alumni
Cornell University alumni
First Nations activists
Writers from Montreal
Academic staff of the University of Victoria
Canada Research Chairs
Indspire Awards
First Nations academics
Indigenous studies in Canada
20th-century First Nations writers
21st-century First Nations writers
Mohawks of Kahnawá:ke
United States Marines